Gordon Beardy is a retired  Anglican bishop.

Beardy was a suffragan bishop of Diocese of Keewatin from 1993 to 1996 and then its diocesan bishop from his election in 1996 until 2001.

References

Anglican bishops of Keewatin
20th-century Anglican Church of Canada bishops
Living people
Year of birth missing (living people)